"The Princess and the Pea" is a fairy tale by Hans Christian Andersen.

The Princess and the Pea may also refer to:

The Princess and the Pea (2001 film), an IMAX film directed by Curtis Linton
The Princess and the Pea (2002 film), an animated film directed by Mark Swan
Princess and the Pea (board game), a children's game
"The Princess and the Pea" (Faerie Tale Theatre), an episode of Faerie Tale Theatre